{{Infobox horseraces
|class      = Group 3
|horse race = Saval Beg Stakes
|image      = 
|caption    = 
|location   = LeopardstownCo. Dublin, Ireland
|inaugurated =
|race type  = Flat / Thoroughbred
|sponsor    = McGrath family
|website    = Leopardstown
|distance   = 1m 6f (2,816 metres)
|surface    = Turf
|track      = Left-handed
|qualification = Four-years-old and up
|weight     = 9 st 7 lb<small>Allowances5 lb for fillies and maresPenalties7 lb for G1 / G2 winners 5 lb for G3 winners 3 lb for Listed winners since June 1 last year</small>
|purse      = €45,500 (2022)1st: €29,500
|bonuses    = 
}}

|}

The Saval Beg Stakes is a Group 3 flat horse race in Ireland open to thoroughbreds aged four years or older. It is run at Leopardstown over a distance of 1 mile and 6 furlongs (2,816 metres), and it is scheduled to take place each year in late May or early June.

The race was formerly contested over a distance of 2 miles. It was cut to 1 mile and 5 furlongs in 1991, and its present length was introduced in 1992.

The minimum age of participating horses was lowered from four to three in 1993, but the previous age restriction was restored in 2006. The race is currently sponsored by the McGrath family and carries the name of Levmoss, a champion racehorse owned by Seamus McGrath.

From 2022, the Saval Beg Stakes promoted to Group 3 while Irish Stayer races reform.

Records
Most successful horse since 1988 (3 wins):
 Order of St George - 2016, 2017, 2018

Leading jockey since 1988 (5 wins):
 Pat Smullen – Vinnie Roe (2002, 2005), Media Puzzle (2006), Profound Beauty (2010), Pale Mimosa (2013)

Leading trainer since 1988 (8 wins):
 Dermot Weld – Sleet Skier (1992), Vintage Crop (1994), Humbel (1996), Vinnie Roe (2002, 2005), Media Puzzle (2006), Profound Beauty (2010), Pale Mimosa (2013)

Winners since 1988

See also
 Horse racing in Ireland
 List of Irish flat horse races

References

 Paris-Turf:
, 
 Racing Post:

 pedigreequery.com – Saval Beg Stakes – Leopardstown.''

Flat races in Ireland
Open long distance horse races
Leopardstown Racecourse